Light Me a Lucifer is a 1962 Australian television comedy film which aired on ABC. Written by John O'Grady, it starred Frank Thring as the devil, along with Wyn Roberts, Edward Howell, Joan Harris, Ken Goodlet and Lynne Flanagan. It was produced in Melbourne.

Australian TV drama was relatively rare at the time.

Despite having aired in an era where wiping was common, the TV film still exists.

Plot
In Hell, Satan (Frank Thring) reproaches his Australian agent, Stoker (Edward Howell) for not bringing enough Australians to Hell. Stoker persuades Satan to come to Sydney with his wife Lilith (Lynne Flanagan) to study the situation.

In Australia, married couple Doris and Harry have a 19-year-old daughter Barbara and a neighbor Bill.

Satan arrives in an industrial suburb as Stoker's boss, Nick Devlin.

The Devil decides to give up being the Devil and becomes an Australian instead.

Cast

Frank Thring as Satan/Nick Devlin
Kenneth Goodlet as Harry Harmon
Joan Harris as Doris Harmon
Edward Howell as Stoker
Wynn Roberts as Bill
Lynne Flanagan as Lilith/Lil Devlin
Bruce Webster
Lyndell Rowe as Barbara Harmon
David Mitchell as Sid, Barbara's boyfriend

Production
The production was announced in September 1962.

William Sterling cast according to type. O'Grady attended rehearsals and made some minor cuts and dialogue re-working. Cas Van Puffen did the design.

Reception
The Sydney Morning Herald TV critic called it a "brilliant Melbourne production" which "gave a candid picture of the unsubtle and rough-diamond Aussie, but was in itself subtle and refined in all the details of manner, pronunciation and setting which make up the Australian in-the-round. The main points in this witty study of Australiana were never rammed home they came up naturally in the dialogue" and "the cast portrayed them to perfection."

The Sunday Herald called it "neither a good play nor a bad play but something in between" in which O'Grady "has a sure and accurate ear for the Australian way of speech... but jammed into 75 minutes of television it wasn't enough to bolster a basically weak comedy."

The Bulletin said it "could   become   a   fairly   good   television  play,   but   not   for   English   ears. The   audio side   of   it   would   be   a   torment   for   them.

The Age TV critic said it "was not the success it might have been had the author, I imagine, had more time to study television techniques. Ten minutes of talk and hardly any action stalled the play... and, for me, it never got going again."

References

External links
 
 Light Me a Lucifer at AustLit
Complete script at National Archives of Australia

1962 films
1960s Australian television plays
Australian television films
Australian Broadcasting Corporation original programming
English-language television shows
Black-and-white Australian television shows
Films directed by William Sterling (director)